Inga Saffron (born November 9, 1957) is an American journalist and architecture critic. She won the 2014 Pulitzer Prize for Criticism while writing for The Philadelphia Inquirer.

Biography
Saffron was raised in Levittown, New York and attended New York University. She studied abroad in France for one year, then decided not to return to school and moved to Dublin. In Ireland, she wrote for many local publications and worked as a freelancer with Newsweek. Upon returning to the United States, Saffron wrote for the Courier-News of New Jersey. She joined The Philadelphia Inquirer in 1984. As the Inquirers Moscow correspondent from 1994 to 1998, Saffron covered the Yugoslav Wars and First Chechen War. She has written an architecture criticism column titled "Changing Skyline" since 1999.

Career
Saffron still writes for The Philadelphia Inquirer, which she joined in 1985 as a suburban reporter. She spent five years in Eastern Europe as a correspondent for the Inquirer. In 1999, Saffron started her "Changing Skyline" column for the Inquirer. She was a Loeb Fellow at the Harvard University Graduate School of Design in 2012. 

Awards
Since becoming The Philadelphia Inquirer's resident architecture critic in 1999, Saffron has won many awards for her insightful and pointed critiques of architecture, planning, and urbanism in her city. Saffron won the Pulitzer Prize for Criticism in 2014 after receiving nominations for the prize in 2004, 2008, and 2009. She is also the 2010 recipient of the Gene Burd Urban Journalism Award. Saffron was one of two architecture critics to be honored with the 2018 Vincent Scully Prize, awarded by the National Building Museum; her fellow honoree was Robert Campbell, who is architecture critic of The Boston Globe.

Partial bibliography
 2002: Caviar: The Strange History and Uncertain Future of the World's Most Coveted Delicacy. Broadway Books. 
 2020: Becoming Philadelphia: How an Old American City Made Itself New Again'''''.  Rutgers University Press.

Marriage and family
She is married to writer Ken Kalfus, with whom she has a daughter, Sky.

References

External links

American architecture critics
1957 births
People from Levittown, New York
New York University alumni
The Philadelphia Inquirer people
Pulitzer Prize for Criticism winners
Living people
American expatriates in Ireland
American women journalists
Journalists from Pennsylvania
20th-century American journalists
20th-century American women writers
21st-century American journalists
21st-century American women writers